A Kiss on the Nose is a short film first released in the United States on August 15, 2004, during the Rhode Island International Film Festival. Written and directed by Laura Neri, the film stars Azita Ghanizada, Gianfranco Russo,  Elena Fabri, Maeva Cifuentes, Monica Cortes, Svilena Kidess, Pat Lach and Warren Sweeney.

Heartland Film festival press Release:

Producer, director and writer Laura Neri received a Jimmy Stewart Memorial Crystal Heart Award for her student dramatic short “A Kiss on the Nose". For the first year, Heartland presented the Vision Award. Sponsored by Vision Racing, the award recognizes an emerging filmmaker who shows vision in filmmaking. All awarding-winning dramatic, documentary and animated short films were eligible for this award. “A Kiss on the Nose” was honored as the inaugural Vision Award winner, and Laura Neri was on hand to accept the award.

Festivals and awards
Laura Neri and her film participated in many festival such as:

 Rhode Island International Film Festival (World Premiere – August 2004)
 Drama International Film Festival (European Premiere – September 2004 – Specially Mentioned by Film Critic Tasso's Goidelic)
 International Student Film Fest Hollywood (November 2004)
 Ohio Independent Film Festival (November 2004)
 Golden Film Festival (USA – February 2005)
 East Lansing Children's Film Festival (USA – February 2005)
 Big Muddy Film Festival (USA – March 2005)
 Damah Spiritual Experience Film Festival (Los Angeles – March 2005)
 35th Annual USA Film Festival/Dallas Short Film & Video Competition (April  2005 – FINALIST)
 Los Angeles Italian Film Awards (April 2005)
 International Funtup Film & Art Festival (USA – May 2005)
 Danville International Children's Film Festival (USA – May 2005 – WINNER: BEST SHORT)
 Lenola Film Festival (Italy – May 2005)
 New York Greek Cultural Center Film & Video Showcase (June 2005)
 Avanca International Film Festival (Portugal – July 2005)
 Action On Film International Film Festival (USA – July 2005 – Nominated for Best Screenplay – WINNER: 2nd place – and Best Actress (Azita Ghanizada) – WINNER: 3rd place)
 Ismailia International Festival for Documentary & Short Films (Egypt – September 2005)
 Mecal International Short Film Festival of Barcelona (Spain – September 2005)
 Sidewalk Moving Picture Festival (USA – September 2005)
 Westwood International Film Festival (USA – October 2005)
 Heartland International Film festival (USA – October 2005 – WINNER: Jimmy Stewart Memorial Crystal Heart Award & WINNER: Vision Award for Best Emerging Filmmaker)
 Quintus Montreal Italian Film Festival (Canada Premiere – October 2005 – WINNER: Best Cinematography)
St John's International Women's Film Festival (Canada – October 2005)
 No Festival Required (USA – December 2005)
 Santa Fe Film Festival (USA – December 2005)
 Tirana International Film festival (Albania – December 2005)
 Thessaloniki Panorama of Independent Filmmakers (Greece – December 2005)
 Flickering Image Festival (USA – January 2006 - WINNER)
 Pune International Film Festival  (India – January 2006)
 Smogdance Film Festival (USA – January 2006 – HONORARY MENTION)
 Goa Spiritual Film Festival (India – February 2006)
 B-Movie Film Fest (USA – March 2006 – NOMINATED FOR BEST SHORT)
 The Other Venice Film festival (USA – March 2006)
 Reel Women International Film Festival (USA – March 2006)
 Kansas City Filmmakers Jubilee (USA – April 2006)
 Antelope Valley Independent Film Festival (USA – April 2006)
 NYC Downtown Film Festival (USA – April 2006)
 Rochester International Film Festival (USA – May 2006 – HONORABLE MENTION)
 Lake Arrowhead International Film Festival (USA – May 2006 – 2nd Place – BEST SHORT)
 Salento International Film Festival (Italy – July 2006)
 FAIF International Film Festival (Hollywood – October 2006)

A.S.C. Charles B. Lang Heritage Award for Outstanding Cinematography, Honorable Mention, 2005.

External links

 A Kiss on the Nose official Website (Archived 2009-10-23)
 Heartland Film Festival

2004 films
2004 short films
American short films
2000s English-language films